Hussein Who Said No ( translit   Rastâxiz, meaning Resurrection) is a historical film directed by Ahmad Reza Darvish. The story narrates Battle of Karbala on Day of Ashura and tells the uprising of Hussein ibn Ali in 680 CE against Yazid ibn Muawiyah ibn Abu Sufyan. The story of the movie is centered around Bukair ibn Al-Hurr ibn Yazid Al-Tamimi Ar-Riyahi.

The Persian-language movie has been dubbed into a number of languages including English, Arabic (with title The Sacrifice) and Bangla.

Plot
After the death of Mu'awiyah, son of Abu Sufyan, Yazid ibn Mu'awiyah calls himself Caliph of the Muslims and writes a letter to the governor of Medina asking Imam Hussein Allegiance to take.  Bukair ibn Harr, who has been chosen as the special courier of the court of Yazid ibn Mu'awiyah, is commissioned to deliver the letter of Yazid ibn Mu'awiyah to Medina.  He is an agile and energetic young man who is striving for the truth. In Medina, he realizes that he is the bearer of a letter in which Imam Hussein was ordered to be killed. In Mecca Bukair gets acquainted with the thoughts and line of thought of Imam Hussein (Imam Shiites).

The people Kufa have sent many letters inviting Imam Hussein to Kufa to help them in the uprising against Yazid, the son of Mu'awiyah. Har Ibn Yazid Riahi, along with Bukair and two thousand riders, are ordered by Ubayd Allah ibn Ziyad to go to the caravan of Imam Hussein, which is moving towards Kufa. A small number of Imam Hussein's caravans are besieged by thousands of Yazid soldiers in Karbala. They realized their mistake, they decided to take refuge in the camp of Hussein Ibn Ali and they are martyred along with him.

Cast
 Arash Aasefi
 Bahador Zamani
 Babak Hamidian
 Anoushirvan Arjmand
 David Sterne
 Shaghayegh Farahani
 Farhad Ghaemian
 Zohre Hamidi
 Parviz Pour Hoseini
 Soroush Goudarzi
 Mir Taher Mazloomi
 Hasan Pourshirazi
 Pouria Poursorkh
 Kourosh Zarei
 Mahtab Keramati
 Talhat Hamdi
 Dawood Hussain
 Yusuf Shekarchi
 Foad Ebrahim
 Jamal Soleiman
 Rezvan Aghili
 Leila Bolukat
 Fawaz Sarwar
 Ghader Pezeshki
 Yavar Ahmadifar
 Behnam Tashakkor
 Anoush Moazami
 Ali Abbasi
 Amir Molavi
 Ali Javidfar
 Saeed Alipour
 Hamid Jadidi
 Mohammad Reza Haghgoo
 Babak Vali
 Reza Akbari Arateh
 Ebrahim Soltan Ali
 Khalilullah Khajeh Nezam
 Hossein Madadi
 Pejman Jafari Samarghandi
 Mahmoud Mohkami

Production 
The movie was financed by private Iranian and foreign film companies. The film's post-production stage was completed at a British studio(Nolinare), and some scenes of the project were created using 3D computer-generated imagery (CGI) technique. British editor Tariq Anwar was in charge of editing the film.

See also

 List of Islamic films

References

External links
 
 

Films about Islam
2014 films
Iranian epic films
Cultural depictions of Husayn ibn Ali
Religious epic films
Persian-language films
Films scored by Stephen Warbeck
Films whose director won the Best Directing Crystal Simorgh
Crystal Simorgh for Best Film winners